Grégory Alldritt (born 23 March 1997) is a French rugby union player, currently playing in the back row and mostly as a number eight, for Top 14 side La Rochelle. 

His father, Terence, was born in Kenya to Irish and Danish parents and lived in Stirling, Scotland before settling down in France. His mother is French. He has two older brothers: Tom and Scott.

International career
Alldritt won his first cap for France as a replacement in the side's 24–19 loss to Wales in the 2019 Six Nations.

International tries

Honours

La Rochelle
 European Rugby Champions Cup: 2021–22
 European Rugby Champions Cup runner-up: 2020–21
 European Rugby Challenge Cup runner-up: 2018-19
 Top 14 runner-up: 2020-21

France
 Six Nations Championship: 2022
 Six Nations Championship runner-up: 2020, 2021

References

External links
 France profile at FFR
 La Rochelle profile
 

1997 births
Living people
French people of Scottish descent
French people of Irish descent
French rugby union players
Stade Rochelais players
Rugby union number eights
Rugby union flankers
France international rugby union players